Alishan or Ali Shan may refer to:

Places
 Alishan, Chiayi, a township in Chiayi County, Taiwan
Alishan National Scenic Area, a mountain resort and nature reserve
 Alishan railway station
 Alishan Range, a mountain range in Taiwan

People 
 Alishan Bairamian (1914–2005), Armenian–American intellectual and author
 Ghevont Alishan (1820–1901), Armenian Catholic priest, historian and poet
 Leonardo Alishan (1951–2005), Armenian–Iranian writer and scholar
 Ali Shan (cricketer) (born 1994), Pakistani cricketer

Other uses
 Alishan salamander, a species of salamander endemic to Taiwan

See also 
 Alishan Qeshlaqi, a village in Ardabil Province, Iran
 Alishanly, a village in the Masally Rayon of Azerbaijan